Westmoreland County is a county in the Commonwealth of Pennsylvania, United States. As of the 2020 census, the population was 364,663. The county seat is Greensburg. Formed from, successively, Lancaster,  Northumberland, and later Bedford counties, Westmoreland County was founded on February 26, 1773, and was the first county in the colony of Pennsylvania whose entire territorial boundary was located west of the Allegheny Mountains.  Westmoreland County originally included the present-day counties of Fayette, Washington, Greene, and parts of Beaver, Allegheny, Indiana, and Armstrong counties. It is named after Westmorland, a historic county of England.

Westmoreland County is included in the Pittsburgh Metropolitan Statistical Area.

History
Formed from Lancaster, Northumberland, and later Bedford counties, Westmoreland County was founded on February 26, 1773, and was the first county in the Pennsylvania colony whose entire territorial boundary was located west of the Allegheny Mountains. Westmoreland County originally included the present-day counties of Fayette, Washington, Greene, and parts of Beaver, Allegheny, Indiana, and Armstrong counties. It is named after Westmorland, a historic county of England.

Geography
Westmoreland has a humid continental climate (Dfa/Dfb). Average monthly temperatures in Greensburg range from 28.7 °F in January to 71.8 °F in July, while in Murrysville they range from 29.4 °F in January to 73.1 °F in July, in Latrobe they range from 28.9 °F in January to 72.0 °F in July, and in Ligonier they range from 28.1 °F in January to 71.1 °F in July.

Adjacent counties
 Armstrong County  (north)
 Indiana County  (northeast)
 Cambria County  (east)
 Somerset County (southeast)
 Fayette County (south)
 Washington County (southwest)
 Allegheny County (west)
 Butler County (northwest)

Major highways

Demographics

At the 2010 census, there were 365,169 people, 153,650 households and 101,928 families residing in the county. The population density was 355.4 per square mile (137.2/km2). There were 168,199 housing units at an average density of 163.7 per square mile (63.2/km2).  The racial makeup of the county was 95.3% White, 2.3% Black or African American, 0.1% Native American, 0.7% Asian, 0.03% Pacific Islander, 0.2% from other races, and 1.2% from two or more races. 0.9% of the population were Hispanic or Latino of any race.

There were 153,650 households, of which 24.5% had children under the age of 18 living with them, 52.2% were married couples living together, 10.0% had a female householder with no husband present, and 33.7% were non-families. 29.0% of all households were made up of individuals, and 13.3% had someone living alone who was 65 years of age or older. The average household size was 2.32, and the average family size was 2.86.

22.3% of the population were under 18, 5.1% from 18 to 24, 22.4% from 25 to 44, 31.3% from 45 to 64, and 18.9% who were 65 years of age or older. The median age was 45.1 years. For every 100 females, there were 94.8 males. For every 100 females age 18 and over, there were 92.3 males.

2020 Census

Politics and government
As of November 7, 2022, there are 248,459 registered voters in Westmoreland County.
 Republican: 122,519 (49.31%)
 Democratic: 95,325 (38.37%)
 Independent: 20,063 (8.07%)
 Minor parties: 10,552 (4.25%)

The Democratic Party historically dominated county-level politics between the New Deal realignment and the turn of the century; however, Westmoreland has trended Republican at the national and statewide levels in the 21st century (in direct lockstep with most other Appalachian counties). In 2000, Republican George W. Bush became the first Republican to carry the county since 1972, and Republicans have carried the county in every election since, increasing the margin of victory in every successive election until 2020. Democratic Governor Ed Rendell lost Westmoreland in both 2002 and 2006. In 2008, Republican Tim Krieger picked up the 57th House district left open by the retirement of Democratic state representative Tom Tangretti. In 2010, both Pat Toomey and Tom Corbett won Westmoreland in their statewide bids. Also, the GOP gained control of two more State House districts, the 54th with Eli Evankovich and the 56th with George Dunbar. In 2011, the Republican Party swept all county row offices. A Democratic resurgence in 2015 gave that party a majority of the county commissioners. However, in the 2019 elections, Democratic elected officials lost that majority and carried only one row office.

As of 2020, the only majority-Democratic cities within the county are Arnold and Monessen.

Presidential elections

|}

County commissioners
 Sean Kertes, Chairman, Republican
 Gina Cerilli, Democratic
 Doug Chew, Republican

Other county officials
 Clerk of Courts, Megan Loughner, Republican
 Controller, Jeff Balzer, Republican
 Coroner, Tim Carson, Republican
 District Attorney, Nicole Ziccarelli, Republican
 Prothonotary, Gina O'Barto, Republican
 Recorder of Deeds, Frank Schiefer, Republican
 Register of Wills, Sherry Magretti-Hamilton, Republican
 Sheriff, James Albert, Sheriff, Republican
 Treasurer, Jared M Squires, Republican

State House of Representatives

State Senate

United States House of Representatives

United States Senate

Education

Public school districts

School districts:
 Belle Vernon Area School District (Also in Fayette County)
 Blairsville-Saltsburg School District (Also in Indiana County)
 Burrell School District
 Derry Area School District
 Franklin Regional School District
 Greater Latrobe School District
 Greensburg-Salem School District
 Hempfield Area School District
 Jeannette City School District
 Kiski Area School District (Also in Armstrong County)
 Leechburg Area School District (Also in Armstrong County)
 Ligonier Valley School District
 Monessen City School District
 Mount Pleasant Area School District
 New Kensington–Arnold School District
 Norwin School District
 Penn-Trafford School District (also in Allegheny County)
 Southmoreland School District (also in Fayette County)
 Yough School District

Public charter schools
 Dr. Robert Ketterer Charter School grades 7th through 12th Latrobe (since 2008)

According to EdNA

Private high school
 Greensburg Central Catholic High School

Colleges and universities
 Penn State New Kensington
 Seton Hill University
 Saint Vincent College
 Westmoreland County Community College
 University of Pittsburgh at Greensburg
 Carlow College at Greensbur]
 Triangle Tech

Additional
Northern Westmoreland Career and Technology Center

Economy
Coal mining became a major industry in the county after the Civil War, followed by expansion of manufacturing of iron, steel and glass. The 600-acre coke works for the Isabella Furnace were built in Cokeville (then Coketown) in Spring of 1872. At one point, company "coal patches" (towns built for miners) represented about one-third of the county's settlements. A major strike by coal miners represented by the United Mine Workers of America took place in 1910–1911. Sixteen people were killed in the strike.

In 2020 the top industries in the county were health care and social services (16.3% of jobs), manufacturing (13.8%) and retail trade (13.7%). Mining comprised less than 1% of the jobs in the county. Westmoreland County is now believed to be the site of over 100 abandoned mines.

Volkswagen's Westmoreland plant near New Stanton in Westmoreland County was the first foreign-owned factory mass-producing automobiles in the U.S. It operated from 1978 to 1988.

Recreation

There are four Pennsylvania state parks in Westmoreland County.
 Keystone State Park
 Laurel Ridge State Park
 Laurel Summit State Park
 Linn Run State Park

Communities

Under Pennsylvania law, there are four types of incorporated municipalities: cities, boroughs, townships, and, in at most two cases, towns. The following cities, boroughs and townships are located in Westmoreland County:

Cities
 Arnold
 Greensburg (county seat)
 Jeannette
 Latrobe
 Lower Burrell
 Monessen
 New Kensington

Boroughs

 Adamsburg
 Arona
 Avonmore
 Bolivar
 Delmont
 Derry
 Donegal
 East Vandergrift
 Export
 Hunker
 Hyde Park
 Irwin
 Laurel Mountain
 Ligonier
 Madison
 Manor
 Mount Pleasant
 Murrysville
 New Alexandria
 New Florence
 New Stanton
 North Belle Vernon
 North Irwin
 Oklahoma
 Penn
 Scottdale
 Seward
 Smithton
 South Greensburg
 Southwest Greensburg
 Sutersville
 Trafford (partly in Allegheny County)
 Vandergrift
 West Leechburg
 West Newton
 Youngstown
 Youngwood

Townships

 Allegheny
 Bell
 Cook
 Derry
 Donegal
 East Huntingdon
 Fairfield
 Hempfield
 Ligonier
 Loyalhanna
 Mount Pleasant
 North Huntingdon
 Penn
 Rostraver
 St. Clair
 Salem
 Sewickley
 South Huntingdon
 Unity
 Upper Burrell
 Washington

Census-designated places
Census-designated places are geographical areas designated by the U.S. Census Bureau for the purposes of compiling demographic data. They are not actual jurisdictions under Pennsylvania law. Other unincorporated communities, such as villages, may be listed here as well.

 Bradenville
 Calumet
 Collinsburg
 Crabtree
 Fellsburg
 Grapeville
 Harrison City
 Herminie
 Hostetter
 Lawson Heights
 Level Green
 Loyalhanna
 Lynnwood Pricedale
 Mammoth
 Millwood
 Norvelt
 St. Vincent College
 Slickville
 Webster
 Wyano
 Yukon

Unincorporated communities

 Acme
 Alverton
 Ardara
 Armbrust
 Baggaley
 Bessemer
 Blackstone
 Boquet
 Bovard
 Brenizer
 Carbon
 Claridge
 Forbes Road
 Greenwald
 Hannastown
 Hopewell
 Hutchinson
 Jacobs Creek
 Jones Mills
 Kecksburg
 Larimer
 Laughlintown
 Lloydsville
 Lowber
 Luxor
 Marguerite
 Morewood
 Moween
 New Derry
 Pandora
 Peanut
 Pleasant Unity
 Reagantown
 Rector
 Reduction
 Ruffs Dale
 Salina
 Scab Hill
 Seger
 Southwest
 Stahlstown
 Standard Shaft
 Tarrs
 Torrance
 Trauger
 Turkeytown
 United
 Wendel
 Westmoreland City
 Whitney
 Yohoghany

Former community
 Franklin Township - now known as Murrysville, Pennsylvania

Population ranking
The population ranking of the following table is based on the 2010 census of Westmoreland County.

† county seat

Notable people

 David Alter, born in Westmoreland County, noted inventor
 Pete Babando, former NHL Hockey player, played for 1950 Stanley Cup champions Detroit Red Wings, born in Braeburn neighborhood of the City of Lower Burrell.
 George Blanda, Hall of Fame football player, born in Youngwood.
 D.J. Coffman, comic book artist and writer, creator of Hero By Night. Born in Mt. Pleasant. Resides in Scottdale.
 Johnny Costa, jazz pianist, was born and raised in Arnold.
 Jesse Root Grant, (father of Ulysses S. Grant General and President) born in Greensburg.
 Shirley Jones, Academy Award-winning actress and singer, grew up in Smithton.
 Sheila Kelley, American actor, born and raised in Greensburg, Pa. Founder of Sheila Kelley S Factor exercise and lifestyle program.
 Bill Mazeroski, Hall of Fame baseball player
 Michael Moorer, boxer
 Arnold Palmer, golfer, was born and raised in Latrobe.
 Terrelle Pryor NFL quarterback, attended Jeannette high school.
 Fred Rogers, television personality, was born, raised, and lived in Latrobe; buried in Unity Cemetery, Unity Township just outside Latrobe.
 Arthur St. Clair, American Revolution Major General, Patriot, 9th President of the Continental Congress, buried in Greensburg, Pa.
 Willie Thrower, football player, was born and raised in New Kensington.
 Jim White, KMOX radio talk show host, born and raised in Greensburg, Pa.
 Jacob Zimmerman (born 1831), newspaper editor, newspaper owner, Illinois politician, mine owner, real estate entrepreneur, and businessman.

See also
 National Register of Historic Places listings in Westmoreland County, Pennsylvania
 Westmoreland Choral Society

References

External links

 

 
1773 establishments in Pennsylvania
Counties of Appalachia
Laurel Highlands
Pittsburgh metropolitan area
Populated places established in 1773